Theories of mental representation are those that rest the cognitive abilities of the mind on the processing of content-laden vehicles, called representations.  Naturalizing these theories involves an account of how a representation, initially posited as a theoretical construct, can be realized in a physical system.  A central aspect of any account of representation is how they derive and designate semantic content.  The possession of meaningful content is the most characteristic property of representations and arguably integral to their functionality. The project of the naturalistic philosopher is to provide an account of the representation relationship between a representation A and its object of intentional content a, such that having content A is entailed by standing in a particular relation with a.

One naturalistic account of the representation relationship is the teleofunctionalist semantics of Fred Dretske.  In his book Explaining Behavior, Dretske outlines a theory for how a component of a physical system can come to possess semantic content.  This theory characterizes a relationship as representational when: one entity is a natural sign of another, and the natural sign is integrated into the function of a larger system as a consequence of being an indicator.

Natural signs are those entities whose existence is dependent on preceding conditions.  Therefore, the existence of a natural sign is an indication that its preceding conditions are or were actually instantiated. For example, footprints in the snow are dependent on the animal that creates them, thus footprints are natural signs.  Exactly what the footprints in the snow indicate, or are natural signs of, is potentially limitless.  A man's footprint could indicate his size, approximate weight, fashion preferences, even infirmities if there are characteristics of a limp.  Conversely, a representation's content is not as broad, nor as unspecified.  As a result, an indication relationship could be necessary for a representation relationship, but not sufficient. Furthermore, natural signs are dependent on the actual existence of their instantiating conditions while representations bear no such dependency relationships. This is the critical feature that allows representations to misrepresent something as the case when it is indeed not.

For a natural sign to become a representation requires additional constraining criteria that designate specific content from among many conditions indicated and free the indicator from absolute dependency on the existence of its instantiating conditions.  The teleological characteristics of Dretske's theory are intended to accomplish the necessary constraints.  Specifically, to be a representation, a natural sign must be employed in the function of a larger system as a result of its holding in an indication relationship.  Since a natural sign may hold in many indication relationships, that relationship for which it is employed by the larger system is taken to be its content-specifying relationship.

By being integrated into the function of a larger system, natural signs also become free of an absolute dependency on the existence of their instantiating conditions.  By contributing its properties of indication to a larger system, a natural sign gains the function of determining what the system takes to be the case. Once this role has been given, changes in what the natural sign indicate are not necessarily reflected in what the system takes the case to be.  Thus, when appropriately integrated, natural signs become representations by identifying specific content and gaining freedom from absolute dependency on their instantiating conditions.

A major criticism of applying naturalistic theories of semantics to mental representation is that they fail to account for all the characteristics of mental states.  Mental states have characteristic phenomenal properties and these properties are not necessitated by naturalistic theories of semantics.  That is to say, these theories identify representations, with equal weight, in both conscious and unconscious systems.  If an explanation is consistent with the absence of phenomenal properties, then it cannot be a full account of mental states.  While this objection does nothing to undermine the progress of naturalistic theories of semantics, it demands that there are further constraining criteria before representation in mental states can be accounted for.

See also
Biosemiotics

References

Further reading
 

Cognitive science
Theory of mind